Johannes Ernst "Hans" Hüneke (12 January 1934 – 14 August 2015) was a German middle-distance runner. He competed in the men's 3000 metres steeplechase at the 1960 Summer Olympics.

References

External links

1934 births
2015 deaths
Athletes (track and field) at the 1960 Summer Olympics
German male middle-distance runners
German male steeplechase runners
Olympic athletes of the United Team of Germany
20th-century German people